Zakrya Ali Kamil (born 25 March 1988) is a retired Qatari long-distance runner who specialized in the 3000 metres steeplechase.

He competed at the 2007 World Championships without reaching the final. At the regional level, he won the silver medal at the 2007 Asian Championships and finished tenth at the 2010 Asian Games.

His personal best time was 8:25.41 minutes, achieved in July 2008 in Tanger.

References

1988 births
Living people
Qatari male steeplechase runners
World Athletics Championships athletes for Qatar
Athletes (track and field) at the 2010 Asian Games
Asian Games competitors for Qatar